Lancelot Hansen (1885–1928) was an Australian rugby league footballer who played in the 1900s.  He played for North Sydney in the NSWRL competition and was a foundation player of the club.

Playing career
Lance Hansen played in North Sydney's inaugural season featuring in 9 matches throughout the season.  Hansen played 2 games for Norths in 1909 and then retired from rugby league.

Hansen played 1 game for New South Wales in 1908 and played 1 match for Metropolis in 1 the same year.

References

North Sydney Bears players
Rugby league players from Sydney
Rugby league halfbacks
1885 births
1928 deaths
New South Wales rugby league team players